The 2020 Montana Attorney General election was held on November 3, 2020, to elect the Attorney General of the U.S. state of Montana. Incumbent Republican Montana Attorney General Tim Fox was re-elected in 2016 with 67.7% of the vote. Fox was term-limited and was ineligible to run for re-election. Fox decided to run for the Governor of Montana election, losing the nomination to Greg Gianforte. Austin Knudsen defeated Jon Bennion in the Republican primary and defeated Democrat Raph Graybill in the general election by over 14 points.

Republican primary

Candidates

Nominee
Austin Knudsen, Roosevelt County Attorney, and former speaker of the Montana House of Representatives

Eliminated in primary
Jon Bennion, chief deputy Attorney General

Results

Democratic primary

Candidates

Nominee
Raph Graybill, chief legal counsel to Governor Steve Bullock

Eliminated in primary
Kimberly Dudik, state representative

Withdrawn
Jim Cossitt, bankruptcy attorney

Declined
John Morrison, former Montana State Auditor

Results

Green primary

Candidates

Disqualified
Roy Davis

Results

General election

Predictions

Fundraising

Polling

Results

References

Notes

External links
Official campaign websites
 Raph Graybill (D) for Attorney General
 Austin Knudsen (R) for Attorney General

Attorney General
Montana
Montana Attorney General elections